The Bahraini Ministry of Foreign Affairs was established in 1971 by an Amiri Decree which also defined its duties and responsibilities and was followed in the same year by Amiri Decree No. (4) for the Year 1971 Regulating the Diplomatic and Consular Corps. Under the decree, the Ministry of Foreign Affairs assumed the responsibility of coordinating and implementing all matters related to the state's foreign policy and its international relations with other countries and international organizations as well as looking after and protecting the interests of Bahraini citizens abroad.

The Ministry of Foreign Affairs has operated within the premises of the Government House (Dar Al Hukuma) until 1983, when it moved to its current own building.

Beginnings of the diplomatic work
Soon after the establishment of the Ministry of Foreign Affairs, the Kingdom of Bahrain began participating in the Arab summits and meetings of the Arab Foreign Ministers, the United Nations General Assembly Sessions (UNGA), the ministerial meetings of the United Nations Security Council (UNSC), Non-Aligned Movement (NAM), Organization of Islamic Cooperation (OIC) and summits and ministerial meetings of the Gulf Cooperation Council (GCC).

Early ambassadors
The early missions of the Kingdom of Bahrain were to New York, London and Cairo. Salman bin Daij was the first ambassador to London. Taqi Al Baharna headed the first mission to the Arab Republic of Egypt, assisted by Ibrahim Ali Ibrahim and Mustapha Kamal, while the first Bahraini ambassador to the United Nations was Salman Al Saffar.

Ministers of Foreign Affairs

Source:

See also

 Politics of Bahrain
 Cabinet of Bahrain
 List of foreign ministry headquarters

References

1971 establishments in Bahrain
Bahrain, Foreign Affairs
Bahrain
Foreign relations of Bahrain
Foreign Affairs